Area code 649 is the local telephone area code of the Turks and Caicos Islands.  Area 649 was created in a split from the original area code 809. It became effective 1 June 1997 and mandatory on 31 May 1998.

Calls within the Turks and Caicos Islands are dialled with seven digits.  Calls to the Turks and Caicos Islands from within the North American Numbering Plan (which includes the United States, Canada and a number of Caribbean islands) are dialled like any other long-distance call: 1 649 xxx xxxx.

From the 1980s to 1997, the islands had just 946, then later also 941, as exchange prefixes.

See also

List of NANP area codes
North American Numbering Plan
Area codes in the Caribbean
Telephone numbers in the United Kingdom

References

External links
North American Numbering Plan Administrator
 List of exchanges from AreaCodeDownload.com, 649 Area Code

649
Communications in the Turks and Caicos Islands